Hillside was a junction and station on the Long Island Rail Road's Main Line and Montauk Branch in Hillside, Queens, New York City, United States. It was located east of where the Montauk Branch now crosses over the two eastbound passenger tracks and the two freight tracks of the Main Line, just west of the Hillside Facility.

History

Hillside's opening date is unknown (although it appeared on the November 1909 public timetable), near Rockaway Junction, although the station should not be confused with the station nearby with the same name as the junction. The new station house replaced the old one on May 15, 1911, and the replacement station first appeared in employee timetable #60 on May 14, 1911. On October 1, 1930 the junction was eliminated when the Montauk Branch was elevated. Less than a year later, it was given high-level platforms, staircases, and a bridge over 177th Street as part of a grade elimination project. The station closed on July 1, 1966. By the year 1975, the station building and grounds were used by an ice cream distributor. Twenty-four years after the station closed, the name was revived for the LIRR's Hillside Maintenance Facility, which was located closer to Rockaway Junction site and nearby Holban Yard.

Confusion with Rockaway Junction station
This station is often confused with the nearby Rockaway Junction station, due to their locations (Rockaway Junction was located two blocks east at 178th Place), and the fact that their years overlap. Hillside's opening is unknown and closed in 1911. It reopened in May 1911 and closed in 1966, while Rockaway Junction opened in 1890 and closed in 1905/1906 and still appeared on timetables until 1910.

References

External links 

Hillside Station Photo History

Former Long Island Rail Road stations in New York City
Railway stations in Queens, New York

Railway stations closed in 1966
Rail junctions in the United States